"It's a Sin" is a country song written by country guitarist Zeb Turner and music publisher Fred Rose. The 1947 version by Eddy Arnold was his second number one on the Country & Western charts, spending five weeks at number one and a total of thirty-eight weeks on the chart.  The B-side of "It's a Sin", a song entitled, "I Couldn't Believe it Was True" would peak at number four on the same chart.

A cover by Marty Robbins peaked at number five on the Billboard Hot Country Singles chart in 1969.

It has also been recorded by Bill Haley & His Comets (1957), Elvis Presley (1961), Don Gibson (1962), George Jones (1965), Dottie West (1969), Del Wood (1980), and Willie Nelson (1995).

References

1947 songs
1969 singles
Eddy Arnold songs
Marty Robbins songs
Songs written by Fred Rose (songwriter)